Tasa is a genus of East Asian jumping spiders that was first described by Wanda Wesołowska in 1981.  it contains only two species, found only in Japan, Korea, and China: T. davidi and T. nipponica.

References

Salticidae genera
Salticidae
Spiders of Asia
Taxa named by Wanda Wesołowska